Thomas Street is a street in central Limerick, Ireland. It is reputed to be named after Thomas Unthank  a prominent 18th century Limerick merchant, however there is no definitive proof for this.  The street begins at a junction off O'Connell Street and continues eastwards towards Wickham Street. At about midway there is a junction for Catherine Street.

Thomas Street has seen major improvement works and re-modelling in recent years. This included the pedestrianisation of the part of the street between O'Connell Street and Catherine Street and the widening of footpaths from Catherine Street to Wickham Street.

Shops on Thomas Street include Brown Thomas, Carl Scarpa and Sextons. There are also a wide variety of cafes on the Street.

References

Shopping districts and streets in Ireland
Streets in Limerick (city)